Too Late to Stop Now: The Very Best of the Dubliners is a career-spanning greatest hits collection of The Dubliners, released in 2006. The album charted at No.23 in Ireland and No.54 in the UK. Disc One features the hits, while Disc Two features selections recorded live at the Gaiety Theatre, Dublin in 2002, including some that were not included on the original Live From The Gaiety CD, but were included on the DVD.

Disc 1 
 Seven Drunken Nights
 Gentleman Soldier
 Finnegan's Wake
 Liverpool Lou
 Spanish Lady
 Marino Waltz
 Town I Loved So Well
 Craic Was Ninety In The Isle Of Man
 Three Lovely Lassies From Kimmage
 Rose of Allendale
 Whiskey In The Jar
 Lark In The Morning
 My Cavan Girl
 Fiddler's Green
 Cooley's/Dawn/Mullingar Races
 Raglan Road
 All For Me Grog
 Auld Triangle
 Molly Malone
 Irish Rover

Disc 2  
 Fermoy Lassies/Sporting Paddy
 Rare Auld Times
 Black Velvet Band
 Lord Of The Dance
 McAlpine's Fusiliers
 Showman's Fancy/Wonder Hornpipe/Swallow's Tail
 Banks Of The Roses
 Carrickfergus
 Dicey Reilly
 Old House
 Whiskey In The Jar
 South Australia
 Fields Of Athenry
 Gerry Cronin's/Denis Langton's/Irish Washerwoman
 Seven Drunken Nights
 Dirty Old Town
 Wild Rover
 Irish Rover

References 

2006 greatest hits albums
The Dubliners compilation albums